The People's Party «For Women of Russia» (NPZZhR; ; Narodnaya partiya «Za zhenshchin Rossii», NPZZhR) was a registered political party in Russia. The history of the party dates back to the founding congress on March 31, 2007. The party approved the charter and program of the party on April 22, 2012.

People's Party "For Women of Russia"

Election results 
In the elections to the Closed administrative district of Fokino in 2013, the party received 3.1%. The party also participated in the elections to the city council of Kamensk-Uralsky.

According to the results of a single election day in 2013, the party won a seat in the State Assembly of the Sakha Republic in a single-mandate constituency 21. Gulsum Beisembayeva represented the party in the Yakut parliament in 2013–2018, she was not elected to the next composition.

The party competed with the Yabloko party in the Volgograd region in the elections to the regional parliament on September 14, 2014.

Party liquidation 
In May 2019, it became known that the Russian Ministry of Justice had filed a lawsuit to liquidate the party in connection with failure to comply with the requirements for mandatory participation in elections (within seven years from the date of registration, the party must participate in a number of elected companies).

On June 14, 2019, the People's Party "For Women of Russia" was liquidated by a decision of the Supreme Court of the Russian Federation for insufficient participation in elections for seven years.

Criticism 
Gazeta.Ru expert Arkady Lyubarev notes the presence in the party of signs of a "single-issue party".

References
Union of Women of Russia

2007 disestablishments in Russia
2019 disestablishments in Russia
Conservative parties in Russia
Defunct conservative parties
Defunct political parties in Russia
Neoconservative parties
Political parties disestablished in 2019
Political parties established in 2007
Single-issue political parties
Women's organizations based in Russia